Jeff Harding may refer to:

 Jeff Harding (actor), American actor
 Jeff Harding (boxer) (born 1965), boxer from Australia
 Jeff Harding (ice hockey) (born 1969), retired Canadian ice hockey player